The 1992–93 Eredivisie season was the 33rd season of the Eredivisie, the top level of ice hockey in the Netherlands. Four teams participated in the league, and the Nijmegen Tigers won the championship.

Regular season

Playoffs

References
Nederlandse IJshockey Bond

Neth
Eredivisie (ice hockey) seasons
Ere 
Ere